Vendrame is a surname. Notable people with the surname include:

 Andrea Vendrame (born 1994), Italian cyclist
 Constantine Vendrame (1893–1957), Italian missionary
 Ezio Vendrame (1947–2020), Italian writer and footballer
 Ivano Vendrame (born 1997), Italian swimmer
 Leo Vendrame (born 1993), Japanese basketball player